Metrocable is the name of two urban cable transport systems in South America:

 Metrocable (Medellín), Colombia
 Metrocable (Caracas), Venezuela